Guy Hastings (died 15 March 1941) was an English-born actor who worked extensively in Australian theatre, radio and film.

He arrived in Australia in 1912 and worked for Bert Bailey in the original production of On Our Selection. In the 1930s he was a particular favourite of director A. R. Harwood.

In his later years Hastings developed health problems and in December 1940 he was told he would never act again. The theatre community organised a benefit for him, consisting  of a production of a play in which he had appeared, The Streets of London. He died not long afterwards, aged 63.

Select credits
On Our Selection (1912) – starred in original production of play
What Happened to Jury (1914) – play
The Hero of the Dardanelles (1915) – film
The Ever Open Door (1917) – play
The Hayseeds' Melbourne Cup (1918) – film
Called Back (1918) – play
The Merry Wives of Windsor (1920) – play – Theatre Royal, Adelaide
Bought and Paid For (1926) – play – Adelaide
The Ghost Train (1929) – play
Young Woodley (1929) – play – Theatre Royal, Melbourne
Spur of the Moment (1931) – film
Diggers (1931) – film
The Streets of London (1933) – play – Garrick Theatre, Melbourne
Secret of the Skies (1934) – film
Clara Gibbings (1934) – film
A Ticket in Tatts (1934) – film
Ten Minute Alibi (1934) – play – Criterion Theatre, Sydney
Show Business (1938) – film
Come Up Smiling (1939) – film
Black Limelight (1939) – play – Minerva Theatre, Sydney

References

External links

Guy Hastings Australian theatre credits at AusStage

Australian male actors
English emigrants to Australia
Year of birth missing
1941 deaths